Britain's Best Drives is a six-part 2009 British television series in which Richard Wilson travels across the UK in reviewing the best driving roads from a motoring guide of the 1950s. In each episode he drives a different car of the period. There was also a seventh episode where Wilson learns how to drive a manual transmission car again.

Episode list

DVD 
This series is available on DVD, distributed by Acorn Media UK.

External links 
 
 

2000s British documentary television series
2009 British television series debuts
2009 British television series endings
BBC television documentaries
British travel television series